Zoran Lemajić (Cyrillic: Зоран Лeмajић, born 8 November 1960) is a Montenegrin retired association footballer who is a goalkeeping coach of Stade Lausanne Ouchy.

Playing career

Club
Born in Nikšić, Lemajić first played with FK Sutjeska Nikšić and FK Bokelj,  before signing for FK Priština.  Then he will spend six seasons in the Portuguese Liga with S.C. Farense, Boavista F.C., Sporting Clube de Portugal and C.S. Marítimo. Between 1996 and 1998 he played in Scotland with Dunfermline Athletic F.C.

Coaching career
After retiring he became goalkeeping coach of FK Mogren, OFK Grbalj, national teams of FR Yugoslavia, Serbia and Montenegro, and Montenegro.

He is member of the direction board of the Montenegrin Football Association since 2001.

References

External links

1960 births
Living people
Footballers from Nikšić
Association football goalkeepers
Yugoslav footballers
Serbia and Montenegro footballers
FK Sutjeska Nikšić players
FK Bokelj players
FC Prishtina players
S.C. Farense players
Boavista F.C. players
Sporting CP footballers
C.S. Marítimo players
Dunfermline Athletic F.C. players
Primeira Liga players
Yugoslav expatriate footballers
Expatriate footballers in Portugal
Serbia and Montenegro expatriate footballers
Expatriate footballers in Scotland
Serbia and Montenegro expatriate sportspeople in Scotland
Montenegrin football managers
OFK Grbalj managers
Montenegrin expatriate sportspeople in Qatar
Montenegrin expatriate sportspeople in Iran
Association football goalkeeping coaches

Montenegrin expatriate sportspeople in Portugal